Hunter Fork is a creek in Barbour County, West Virginia. It is a tributary of Sugar Creek, which flows into the Tygart Valley River.

Hunter Fork was so named on account of it being an area in which game is hunted.

A historic school named Hunter Fork School is built on the bank of Hunter Fork in Barbour County.

See also
List of rivers of West Virginia

References

Rivers of Barbour County, West Virginia
Rivers of West Virginia